Sarah Patterson (born ) is an English film actress.

For her acting debut, Patterson starred as Rosaleen, a Little Red Riding Hood counterpart, in the Neil Jordan and Angela Carter film The Company of Wolves (1984). In 1987, she starred in another fairy tale-inspired film, playing the titular heroine in Cannon Films' Snow White. Neither of these films were great commercial successes; however, the actress did develop somewhat of a cult following. She has only appeared in a couple of films since, both produced by Valiant Doll: her friend Lisa Gornick's independent film production company. The Valiant Doll film Do I Love You? marked her return to film after an absence of over a decade, and she later appeared in Tick Tock Lullaby.

Filmography

Notes

References

External links
 
 
 
 

1970s births
Living people
Actresses from London
English film actresses
20th-century English actresses
21st-century English actresses